Thelma Awori is a Ugandan professor, former Assistant Secretary-General of the United Nations, and feminist. She  was born on March 25, 1943 in Monrovia, Liberia and came to Uganda in 1965. She is a former Uganda People's Congress diehard, who defected to the Movement. She is an individual African feminist who believes in justice for women and the validity of women’s perspectives. She sadly found an extremely high prevalence of internalized oppression due to religion and socialization.

Education 
She studied at Harvard University while attaining her Bachelor of Arts cum laude Social Relations & Cultural Anthropology. At the University of California at Berkeley, she obtained a Master of Arts Adult Education & Humanistic Psychology. She obtained a PhD in 2006 from Columbia University in New York City.

Work experience 
She lives in Uganda and works across the continent of Africa. She is an adult educator who raises people’s political consciousness around gender and macroeconomic injustice. Thelma is a trained facilitator. She worked as the Deputy Director at UNIFEM since 1990. She was also employed as the Chief at Africa Section, UNIFEM, New York. She worked as a Consultant at UNIFEM, ILCO of Netherlands, United Nations Children's Fund, and United States Agency for International Development, since 1981.

Thelma also worked as the Executive Secretary, Commission for Communication Education, World Association for Christian Communication, London, 1977–1981. From 1973 to 1977, she served as the Lecturer at the College of Adult and Distance Education at University of Nairobi, Kenya. Between, 1965–1972, she was the Senior Tutor at the Centre for Continuing Education, Makerere University, Uganda teaching Sociology. She completed a two-year term as Assistant Secretary-General of the United Nations.

She is the  Executive Director of the Institute for Social Transformation (IST), and also serves as Counsellor General for the Government of Liberia in Uganda. She influences policy and action across the continent. She worked as the Assistant Secretary General responsible for UNDP’s Africa Bureau based in New York. Thelma Awori is the Board Chairperson of Africa Leadership Institute. She is the Honorary Consul of Liberia to Uganda.

She is a former assistant secretary general of the United Nations and also director of the Regional Bureau for Africa of the UN Development Programme (UNDP). She served the United Nations for 12 years, as deputy director for UNIFEM and as resident coordinator of the UN System in Zimbabwe. From 1965, She has been an active participant in the just struggle of the Women of Uganda for gender equality and that is why on 8 March 2018, she was one of the 10 women recognized and honored for making Uganda proud in various fields of human endeavor in the Country.

She is the Founding Chair and Co-President, Sustainable Market Women's Fund, Liberia formerly (Sirleaf Market Women's Fund) which has directly and indirectly empowered over 15,000 market women in Liberia

Other responsibilities 
She belongs to the Membership of African Association for Literacy and Adult Education, Nairobi, and  American Society for Training and Development. She is a member of the Steering Committee of the African Women's Leadership Network where she coordinates programs that empower women in agriculture and support women market vendors across the continent.

Personal details 
She is married to Aggrey Awori who was the Minister for Information and Communications Technology in the Cabinet of Uganda from 16 February 2009 to 27 May 2011. Aggrey Awori  and Thelma Awori met at Harvard University, USA during 1960s when they were students at Harvard University.

See also 
 Aggrey Awori
 Margaret C. Snyder
 Angelina Wapakhabulo
 Pumla Kisosonkole

External links 
 Thelma Awori on LinkedIn
 Thelma Awori on Facebook
 Interview with Thelma Awori
 Thelma Awori on Africa in Harlem
 Thelma Awori on Security Council Open Debate on Women, Peace and Security

References 

1943 births
Ugandan feminists
Ugandan women's rights activists
Ugandan women academics
Academic staff of Makerere University
Harvard College alumni
Academic staff of the University of Nairobi
UC Berkeley Graduate School of Education alumni
Teachers College, Columbia University alumni
Living people
20th-century Ugandan women politicians
20th-century Ugandan politicians